Ottoman Armenians were a significant ethnic population within the Ottoman Empire. Armenians in the empire mostly belonged to either the Armenian Apostolic Church or the Armenian Catholic Church. They were part of the Armenian millet until the Tanzimat reforms in the nineteenth century equalized all Ottoman citizens before the law. Armenians were a significant minority in the Empire. They played a crucial role in Ottoman industry and commerce, and Armenian communities existed in almost every major city of the empire. Despite their importance, Armenians were heavily persecuted by the Ottoman authorities especially from the latter half of the 19th century, culminating in the Armenian Genocide.

Background

The Ottomans introduced a number of unique approaches to governing into the traditions of Islam. Islamic culture did not separate religious and secular matters. At first, the Sultan was the highest power in the land and had control over almost everything. However, a state organization began to take a more definite shape in the first half of the sixteenth century under Suleyman I, also known as "Lawgiver". The Ottomans visualized two separate "establishments" to share state power, one responsible for governing a nation's citizens and the other its military. "The Ottomans left civic control to the civic institutions. Historians often label the Ottoman sociopolitical construct the "Ottoman System". Noteworthy, however, the term "Ottoman System" conveys a sense of structural rigidity that probably was nonexistent throughout the Ottoman period.

The Armenian population's integration was partly due to the nonexistent structural rigidity throughout the initial period. Armenian people, related to the issues of their own internal affairs were administered by the civil administration. Townspeople, villagers and farmers formed a class called the flock/reaya, including Armenian reaya. Civil and judicial administration was carried out under a separate parallel system of small municipal or rural units called kazas. The civil system was considered a check on the military system since beys, who represented executive authority on reaya, could not carry out punishment without a sentence from the religious leader of the person. Also, the Sultan was beyond the mentioned control. The Ecumenical Patriarchate was the leader of the Armenian People. This whole structure was named in the Armenian case Armenian Millet.

During the Byzantine period, the Armenian Church was not allowed to operate in Constantinople, because the Greek Orthodox Church regarded the Armenian Church as heretical. With the establishment of Ecumenical Patriarchate of Constantinople, Armenians became religious leaders, and bureaucrats under the Ottoman Empire became more influential than just their own community. The idea that two separate "establishments" shared state power gave people a chance to occupy important positions, administrative, the religious-legal, and the social-economic.

Armenians occupied important posts within the Ottoman Empire, Artin Dadyan Pasha, who served as minister of foreign affairs from 1876 to 1901, is one of many examples of Armenian citizens who played a fundamental role in the sociopolitical sphere of the Ottoman Empire.

Role of Armenians in the Ottoman economy
Certain elite Armenian families in the Ottoman Empire gained the trust of the Sultans and were able to achieve important positions in the Ottoman government and the Ottoman economy. Even though their numbers were small compared to the whole Ottoman Armenian population, this caused some resentment among Ottoman nationalists. The life of the rest of the common Armenians was a very difficult existence because they were treated as second class citizens.
Those elite Armenians that did achieve great success were individuals such as Abraham Pasha, and Gabriel Noradunkyan who became secretary of State for Foreign Affairs. The Dadian family controlled the entire munitions industry in the Ottoman Empire. Calouste Gulbenkian became one of the main advisors of the National Bank of Turkey and the Turkish Petroleum Corporation, which later became the Iraqi Oil Corporation.
Historian A. Tchamkerten writes "Armenian achievements in the Empire was not only in trade, however. They were involved in almost all economic sectors and held the highest levels of responsibility. In the 19th century, various Armenian families became the Sultan's goldsmiths, Sultan's architects and took over the currency reserves and the reserves of gold and silver, including customs duty. Sixteen of the eighteen most important bankers in the Ottoman Empire were Armenian". (Calouste Sarkis Gulbenkian: The man and his work. Lisbon: Gulbenkian Foundation Press.2010) Ottoman Armenians were overrepresented in commerce. As middleman minorities, despite the wealth of some Armenians, their overall political power was low, making them especially vulnerable.

Patriarchate of Constantinople

After Constantinople fell to the Ottoman Turks in 1453, the patriarchate came to care more directly for all the Orthodox living in the Ottoman Empire. Hovagim I was at the time the Metropolitan of Bursa. In 1461, Hovagim I was brought to Constantinople by Sultan Mehmed II and established the Armenian Patriarch of Constantinople for political reasons. Sultan Mehmed II wanted Armenian-Greek separation. Constantinople become the real center of their ecclesiastical and national life. The Armenian patriarch and not the Catholicos of Etchmiadzin, was their most important national dignitary, as part of Mehmed's wish. The largest Armenian community in the world lived in the Sultan's capital and his civil-ecclesiastical authority made the Sultan the most powerful official for Armenians in practice. Probably, before the Ottoman conquest in 1453 there had been no Armenian churches in Constantinople. After 1453, 55 Armenian churches were built in Istanbul.

Until the promulgation of the Hatt-i Sherif of 1839, the patriarch and his clients, within limits, possessed penal authority over the Armenian people. At the capital the patriarch had his own jail, and maintained a small police force. His authority over his clergy being absolute, he could imprison or exile them at will; and while he was compelled to secure the consent of the Sultan to imprison or exile laymen of his community, the necessary firman was very easily obtained. The patriarchal system of government, in placing civil powers in the hands of high ecclesiastics, was an outcome of the fact that the Sultan made no distinction between church and community, and often lent the weight of its authority to maintain the integrity of the church.

Armenian village life
In villages, including those of which the population was chiefly Muslim, the Armenian quarters were settled in groups among other parts of the population. Compared to others, Armenians lived in well-built homes. The houses were arranged one above the other, so that the flat roof of the lower house serves as the front yard of the one above it. For safety, the houses were huddled together. Armenian dwellings were adapted to the extremes of temperature in the highlands of Western Armenia (renamed Eastern Anatolia in 1941). In summer the thick walls and earth-covered roofs kept the rooms cool. The natural and agricultural traditions of Armenians were similar to others, but characteristics can also be found in Xenophon, who described many aspects of Armenian village life and hospitality. He related that the people spoke a language that to his ear sounded like the language of the Persians.

The Bey or elder was something of a leader for the village, and his house was typically the most luxurious dwelling in a village. It was not uncommon to have three priests for thirty-five families. Most Armenians travelled on horseback to neighbouring villages, sometimes for religious ceremonies (like the Van festival), sometimes to fetch a bride, accompanying her, with musical instruments and clapping of hands, to their own village.

Ottoman Armenia, 1453–1829

Armenians preserved their culture, history, and language through the course of time, largely thanks to their distinct religious identity among the neighboring Turks and Kurds. Like the Greek Orthodox and Jewish minorities of the Ottoman Empire, they constituted a distinct millet, led by the Armenian Patriarch of Constantinople. Under this system, Christians and Jews were considered religious minorities/second-class citizens; they were subjected to elevated taxation, but in return they were granted autonomy within their own religious communities and were exempted from military service. Growing religious and political influence from neighboring communities necessitated implementation of security measures that often required a longer waiting period for minorities to seek legal recourse in the courts. Under Ottoman rule, Armenians formed three distinct millets: Armenian Orthodox Gregorians, Armenian Catholics, and Armenian Protestants (in the 19th century).

After many centuries of Turkish rule in Anatolia and Armenia (at first by the Seljuks, then a variety of Anatolian beyliks and finally the Ottomans), the centres with a high concentration of Armenians lost their geographic continuity (parts of Van, Bitlis, and Kharput vilayets). Over the centuries, tribes of Turks and Kurds settled into Anatolia and Armenia, which was left severely depopulated by a slew of devastating events such as the Byzantine-Persian Wars, Byzantine-Arab Wars, Turkish migration, Mongol Invasions and finally the bloody campaigns of Tamerlane.

In addition, there were the century-long Ottoman-Persian Wars between the rival empires, the battlegrounds of which ranged over Western Armenia (therefore large parts of the native lands of the Armenians), causing the region and its peoples to be passed between the Ottomans and Persians numerous times. The wars between the arch-rivals started from the early 16th century and lasted till well into the 19th century, having disastrous effects for the native inhabitants of these regions, including the Armenians of Western Armenia.

Owing to these events, the composition of the population had undergone (ever since the second half of the medieval period) a transformation so profound that the Armenians constituted, over the whole extent of their ancient homeland, no more than a quarter of the total inhabitants. Despite this they kept and defended factual autonomy in certain isolated areas like Sassoun, Shatakh, and parts of Dersim. An Armenian stronghold and a symbol of factual Armenian autonomy, Zeitoun (Ulnia) was located between the Six Vilayets and Cilicia, which also had a strong Armenian presence ever since the creation of the Principality (and then Kingdom) of Lesser Armenia. However, the destruction of the Kingdom by the Ramadanid tribe and the subsequent rule by Muslim powers such as the Dulkadirids, the Mamluks and the Ottomans led to ever increasing numbers of Muslims in the region until finally the genocide removed the remaining vestiges of the Armenian people.

There were also significant communities in parts of Trebizond and Ankara vilayets bordering Six vilayets (such as in Kayseri). After the Ottoman conquests many Armenians also moved west and settled in Anatolia, in large and prosperous Ottoman cities like Istanbul and Izmir.

Western Armenia, 1829–1918

The remaining Ottoman Armenia, composed of the Six vilayets (Erzurum, Van, Bitlis, Diyarbekir, Kharput, and Sivas) up to World War I, under Ottoman rule, was also referred to as Western Armenia.

Armenians during the 19th century

Aside from the learned professions taught at the schools that had opened throughout the Ottoman Empire, the chief occupations were trade and commerce, industry, and agriculture. The peasants were agriculturists. In the empire, Armenians were raised to higher occupations, like Calouste Sarkis Gulbenkian was a businessman and philanthropist. He played a major role in making the petroleum reserves of the Middle East available to Western development. The Armenian Press and literature during this period established institutions that were critical; this attitude has been invaluable in reforming abuses and introducing improvements in Armenian communities. Thus their critical instinct was positive, rather than negative. Armenians organized themselves for different objects; witness their numerous societies, clubs, political parties, and other associations. Hovsep Pushman was a painter who became very famous in the Empire. During this period Armenians would establish a church, a school, a library, and a newspaper. Sargis Mubayeajian was a prolific and multifarious writer educated in Constantinople. Many of his works are still scattered in Armenian periodicals.

Many Armenians, who after having emigrated to foreign countries and becoming prosperous there, returned to their native land. Alex Manoogian who became a philanthropist and active member of the Armenian General Benevolent Union was from Ottoman lands (modern Izmir), Arthur Edmund Carewe, born Trebizond, become an actor in the silent film era.

Armenians occupied important posts within the Ottoman Empire, Artin Dadyan Pasha served as Minister of foreign affairs of the Ottoman Empire from 1876 to 1901 and is an example that Armenian citizens served the Ottoman Empire.

Eastern Question

The Eastern Question (normally dated to 1774) is used in European history to refer to the diplomatic and political problems posed by the decay of the Ottoman Empire during the 18th century; including instability in the territories ruled by the Ottoman Empire. The position of educated and privileged Christians within the Ottoman Empire improved in the 17th and 18th centuries, and the Ottomans increasingly recognized the missing skills which the larger Ottoman population lacked, and as the empire became more settled it began to feel its increasing backwardness in relation to the European powers. European powers on the other side, engaged in a power struggle to safeguard their militaristic, strategic and commercial interests in the Empire, this gave motivation to the powers to help people in need. The rise of nationalism under the Ottoman Empire as a direct result of enlightenment of Christian millets through education, was the dominant theme. Armenians, However, for the most part, remained passive during these years, earning them the title of millet-i sadıka or the "loyal millet".

The Eastern Question gained even more traction by the late 1820s, due to the Greek Enlightenment and Greek War of Independence setting an example for making independence against the Ottomans, and along with several countries of the Balkans, frustrated with conditions, had, often with the help of the Powers, broken free of Ottoman rule. The Great Power Imperial Russia stood to benefit from the decline of the Ottoman Empire; on the other hand, Austria and the United Kingdom deemed the preservation of Empire to be in their best interests. The position of France changed several times over the centuries. Armenian involvement on the international stage would have to wait until the Armenian national awakening, which the Armenian Question as used in European history, became commonplace among diplomatic circles and in the popular press after the Congress of Berlin (1878). The Armenian national ideology developed long after the Greek movement. However, the factors contributing to the emergence of Armenian nationalism made the movement far more similar to that of the Greeks than those of other ethnic groups.

Reform implementation, 1860s–1880s

The three major European powers: Great Britain, France and Russia (known as the Great Powers), took issue with the Empire's treatment of its Christian minorities and increasingly pressured the Ottoman government (also known as the Sublime Porte) to extend equal rights to all its citizens.

Beginning in 1839, the Ottoman government implemented the Tanzimat reforms to improve the situation of minorities, although these would prove largely ineffective. In 1856, the Hatt-ı Hümayun promised equality for all Ottoman citizens irrespective of their ethnicity and confession, widening the scope of the 1839 Hatt-ı Şerif of Gülhane. The reformist period peaked with the Constitution, called the Kanûn-ı Esâsî (meaning "Basic Law" in Ottoman Turkish), written by members of the Young Ottomans, which was promulgated on 23 November 1876. It established freedom of belief and equality of all citizens before the law. "Firman of the Reforms" gave immense privileges to the Armenians, which formed a "governance in governance" to eliminate the aristocratic dominance of the Armenian nobles by development of the political strata in the society.

Armenian National Constitution, 1863

In 1863, the Armenian National Constitution (Ottoman Turkish:"Nizâmnâme-i Millet-i Ermeniyân") was Ottoman Empire approved. It was a form of the "Code of Regulations" composed of 150 articles drafted by the "Armenian intelligentsia", which defined the powers of Patriarch (a position in the Ottoman Millet) and newly formed "Armenian National Assembly". Mikrtich issued a decree permitting women to have equal votes with men and asking them to take part in all elections.

The Armenian National Assembly had wide-ranging functions. Muslim officials were not employed to collect taxes in Armenian villages, but the taxes in all the Armenian villages collected by Armenian tax-gatherers appointed by the Armenian National Assembly. Armenians were allowed to establish their own courts of justice for the purpose of administering justice and conducting litigation between Armenians, and for deciding all questions relating to marriage, divorce, estate, inheritance, etc., appertaining to themselves. Also Armenians were allowed the right to establish their own prisons for the incarceration of offending Armenians, and in no case should an Armenian be imprisoned in an Ottoman prison.

The Armenian National Assembly also had the power to elect the Armenian Governor by a local Armenian legislative council. The councils later will be part of elections during second constitutional era. Local Armenian legislative councils were composed of six Armenians elected by the Armenian National Assembly.

Education and social work

Beginning in 1863, education was available to all subjects, as far as funds permitted it. Such education was under the direction of lay committees. During this period in Russian Armenia, the association of the schools with the Church was close, but the same principle obtains. This became a problem for the Russian administration, which peaked during 1897 when Tsar Nicholas appointed the Armenophobic Grigory Sergeyevich Golitsin as governor of Transcaucasia, and Armenian schools, cultural associations, newspapers and libraries were closed.

The Armenian charitable works, hospitals, and provident institutions were organized along the explained perspective. The Armenians, in addition to paying taxes to the State, voluntarily imposed extra burdens on themselves in order to support these philanthropic agencies. The taxes to the State did not have direct return to Armenians in such cases.

Armenian Question, 1877

The Armenian Question, as used in European history, became common place among diplomatic circles and in the popular press after the Congress of Berlin (1878); that in like Eastern Question (normally dated to 1774), refers to powers of Europe's involvement to the Armenian subjects of the Ottoman Empire beginning with the Russo-Turkish War of 1877-78. However, in specific terms, the Armenian question refers to the protection and the freedoms of Armenians from their neighboring communities. The "Armenian question" explains the forty years of Armenian-Ottoman history in the context of English, German, Russian politics between 1877 and 1914.

National awakening, 1880s

The national liberation movement of the Balkan peoples (see: national awakenings in Balkans) and the immediate involvement of the European powers in the Eastern question had a powerful effect on the hitherto suppressed national movement among the Armenians of the Ottoman Empire – on the development of a national liberation ideology. The Armenian national liberation movement was the Armenian national effort to free the historic Armenian homeland of eastern Asia Minor and Transcaucasus from Russian and Ottoman rule and re-establish the independent Armenian state. Those Armenians who did not support national liberation aspirations or who were neutral were called chezoks.

Sultan Abdul Hamid II, 1876–1909

Abdul Hamid II was the 34th Sultan and oversaw a period of decline in the power and extent of the Empire, ruling from 31 August 1876 until he was deposed on 27 April 1909. He was the last Ottoman Sultan to rule with absolute power.

Bashkaleh clash, 1889

The Bashkaleh clash was the bloody encounter between the Armenakan Party and the Ottoman Empire in May 1889. Its name comes from Başkale, a border town of Van Eyalet of the Ottoman Empire. The event was important, as it was reflected in main Armenian newspapers as the recovered documents on the Armenakans showed an extensive plot for a national movement. Ottoman officials believed that the men were members of a large revolutionary apparatus and the discussion was reflected on newspapers, (Eastern Express, Oriental Advertiser, Saadet, and Tarik) and the responses were on the Armenian papers. In some Armenian circles, this event was considered as a martyrdom and brought other armed conflicts. The Bashkaleh Resistance was on the Persian border, which the Armenakans were in communication with Armenians in the Persian Empire. The Gugunian Expedition, which followed within the couple months, was an attempt by a small group of Armenian nationalists from the Russian Armenia to launch an armed expedition across the border into the Ottoman Empire in 1890 in support of local Armenians.

Kum Kapu demonstration, 1890
The Kum Kapu demonstration occurred at the Armenian quarter of Kum Kapu, the seat of the Armenian Patriarch, was spared through the prompt action of the commandant, Hassan Aga. On 27 July 1890, Harutiun Jangülian, Mihran Damadian and Hambartsum Boyajian interrupted the Armenian mass to read a manifesto and denounce the indifference of the Armenian patriarch and Armenian National Assembly. Harutiun Jangülian (member from Van) tried to assassinate the Patriarch of Istanbul. The goal was to persuade the Armenian clerics to bring their policies into alignment with the national politics. They soon forced the patriarch to join the procession heading to the Yildiz Palace to demand implementation of Article 61 of the Treaty of Berlin. It is significant that this massacre, in which 6000 Armenians are said to have perished, was not the result of a general rising of the Muslim population. The Softas took no part in it, and many Armenians found refuge in the Muslim sections of the city.

Bloody years, 1894–96

The first notable battle in the Armenian resistance movement took place in Sassoun, where nationalist ideals were proliferated by Hunchak activists, such as Mihran Damadian and Hampartsoum Boyadjian. The Armenian Revolutionary Federation also played a significant role in arming the people of the region. The Armenians of Sassoun confronted the Ottoman army and Kurdish irregulars at Sassoun, succumbing to superior numbers. This was followed by Zeitun Rebellion (1895–96), which took place between 1891 and 1895, Hunchak activists toured various regions of Cilicia and Zeitun to encourage resistance, and established new branches of the Social Democrat Hunchakian Party.

The 1896 Ottoman Bank takeover was perpetrated by an Armenian group armed with pistols, grenades, dynamite and hand-held bombs against the Ottoman Bank in Istanbul. The seizure of the bank lasted 14 hours, resulting in the deaths of 10 of the Armenian men and Ottoman soldiers. The Ottoman reaction to takeover saw further massacres and pogroms of the several thousand Armenians living in Constantinople and Sultan Abdul Hamid II threatening to level the entire building itself. However, intervention on part of the European diplomats in the city managed to persuade the men to give, assigning safe passage to the survivors to France. Despite the level of violence the incident had wrought, the takeover was reported positively in the European press, praising the men for their courage and the objectives they attempted to accomplish. The years between 1894 and 1896 ended, with estimates of the dead ranging from 80,000 to 300,000. The Hamidian massacres are named for Sultan Abdul Hamid II, whose efforts to reinforce the territorial integrity of the embattled Ottoman Empire resulted in the massacres.

Sasun Uprising, 1904

Ottoman officials involved in the Sasun uprising, who were previously defeated in the First Zeitoun Rebellion, did not want the formation of another semi-autonomous Armenian region in the "Eastern" vilayets. In Sasun, Armenian activists were working to arm the folk and to recruit young men by motivating them to the Armenian cause. 50,000 Turkish and Kurdish troops started the offensive in Sasun, where 500 fedayees had to defend 20,000 unarmed people. The Armenians were headed by Andranik Ozanian along with Kevork Chavoush, Sepasdatsi Mourad, Keri, Hrayr Tjokhk, and others.

Assassination attempt on Sultan Abdul Hamid II, 1905

The events of the Hamidian massacres and Sultan Abdul Hamid II's continued anti-Armenian policies gave way for the Armenian Revolutionary Federation to plan an assassination attempt on the sultan to enact vengeance. Dashnak members, led by ARF founder Christapor Mikaelian, secretly started producing explosives and planning the operation in Sofia, Bulgaria. The assassination attempt was unsuccessful in killing Abdul Hamid II, although it resulted in the death of 26 people and a further 58 wounded.

Dissolution, 1908–18

The Second Constitutional Era of the Empire began shortly after Sultan Abdülhamid II restored the constitutional monarchy after the 1908 Young Turk Revolution. The period established many political groups. A series of elections during this period resulted in the gradual ascendance of the Committee of Union and Progress's ("CUP") domination in politics. This period also marked the dissolution of the Ottoman Empire.

Young Turk Revolution, 1908

On 24 July 1908, Armenians' hopes for equality in the empire brightened with the removal of Hamid II from power and restored the country back to a constitutional monarchy. Two of the largest revolutionary groups trying to overthrow Sultan Abdul Hamid II had been the Armenian Revolutionary Federation and the Committee of Union and Progress, a group of mostly European-educated Turks. In a general assembly meeting in 1907, the ARF acknowledged that the Armenian and Turkish revolutionaries had the same goals. Although the Tanzimat reforms had given Armenians more rights and seats in the parliament, the ARF hoped to gain autonomy to govern Armenian populated areas of the Ottoman Empire as a "state within a state". The "Second congress of the Ottoman opposition" took place in Paris, France, in 1907. Opposition leaders including Ahmed Riza (liberal), Sabahheddin Bey, and ARF member Khachatur Maloumian attended. During the meeting, an alliance between the two parties was officially declared. The ARF decided to cooperate with the Committee of Union and Progress, hoping that if the Young Turks came to power, autonomy would be granted to the Armenians.

Balkan Wars 
Andranik Ozanian participated in the Balkan Wars of 1912–1913 alongside general Garegin Nzhdeh as a commander of Armenian auxiliary troops. Andranik met revolutionist Boris Sarafov and the two pledged to work jointly for the oppressed peoples of Armenia and Macedonia. Andranik participated in the First Balkan War alongside Nzhdeh as a Chief Commander of 12th Battalion of Lozengrad Third Brigade of the Macedonian-Adrianopolitan militia under the command of Colonel Aleksandar Protogerov. His detachment consisted of 273 Armenian volunteers. On 5 May 1912, the Armenian Revolutionary Federation officially severed the relations with the Ottoman government; a public declaration of the Western Bureau printed in the official announcement was directed to "Ottoman Citizens". The June issue of Droshak ran an editorial about it. There were overwhelming numbers of Armenians who served the Empire units with distinction during Balkan wars.

Armenian reform package, 1914

The Armenian reform package was an arrangement negotiated with Russia, acting on behalf of the Great Powers, and the Ottoman Empire. It aimed to introduce reforms to the Armenian citizens of the empire. This agreement, which was solidified in February 1914 was based on the arrangements nominally made in 1878. According to this arrangement the inspectors general, whose powers and duties constituted the key to the question, were to be named for a period of ten years, and their engagement was not to be revocable during that period.

Population

World War I, 1914–18

During World War I, the Ottoman Empire and Russian Empire engaged each other in Caucasus and Persian Campaigns, and the CUP began to look on the Armenians with distrust and suspicion. This was due to the fact that the Russian army contained a contingent of Armenian volunteers. On 24 April 1915, Armenian intellectuals were arrested by Ottoman authorities and, with the Tehcir Law (29 May 1915), eventually a large proportion of Armenians living in Western Armenia perished in what has become known as the Armenian genocide. There was local Armenian resistance in the region, developed against the activities of the Ottoman Empire. The events of 1915 to 1917 are regarded by Armenians, Western historians, and even some Turkish writers and historians like Taner Akçam and Orhan Pamuk, to have been state-sponsored and planned mass killings, or genocide.

See also
 History of Armenia
 Timeline of Armenian history
 Armenians in Turkey
 Anti-Armenian sentiment in Turkey
 Ottoman Armenian population
 Armenian Patriarch of Constantinople
 Armenian Sport in the Ottoman Empire

References

Further reading

External links
A list of Armenian Ministers, Members of Parliament, Ambassadors, General Directors and other High-level bureaucrats of the Ottoman Empire

Christianity in the Ottoman Empire
 

de:Armenien#Armenier im Osmanischen Reich